Cheiruridae is a family of phacopid trilobites of the suborder Cheirurina. Its members, as with other members of the suborder, had distinctive pygidia modified into finger-like spines. They first appeared in the uppermost Cambrian (upper Furongian), and persisted until the end of the Middle Devonian (Givetian). Currently about 657 species assigned to 99 genera are included.

Distribution 
The subfamily Cheirurinae with 269 species in 38 genera occur from the Floian to the Givetian and are probably monophyletic. The 109 species in 15 genera of the Acanthoparyphinae are also probably monophyletic, and are known from the Floian to the Ludfordian. The Cyrtometopinae were present between the Floian and the Upper Katian, enveloping 22 species in 5 genera, of which the monophyly is unclear. The Deiphoninae are probably monophyletic, occur from the Dapingian to the Gorstian, having 71 species assigned to 6 genera. The possibly paraphyletic Eccoptochilinae with 67 species in 13 genera are known between the Floian and upper Katian. The Heliomerinae are a small monophyletic group with 13 species in 2 genera. The Pilekiinae are the earliest subfamilily and therefore certainly paraphyletic, occurring in the upper Furongian and going extinct in the Darriwilian with 56 known species assigned to 19 genera. The monotypic Sphaerexochinae has about 50 species between the Floian and Přídolí.

Genera

Acanthoparypha
Actinopeltis
Anasobella
Ancyginaspis
Apollonaspis
Arcticeraurinella
Areia
Areiaspis
Azyptyx
Barrandeopeltis
Borealaspis
Bornholmaspis
Bufoceraurus
Ceraurinella
Ceraurinium
Ceraurinus
Cerauromeros
Cerauropeltis
Ceraurus
Cheirurus (type genus)
Chiozoon
Contracheirurus
Courtessolium
Crotalocephalides
Crotalocephalina
Crotalocephalus
Cybelloides
Cyrtometopus
Deiphon
Didrepanon
Eccoptochile
Eccoptochiloides
Forteyops
Foulonia
Gabriceraurus
Geracephalina
Hadromeros
Hammannopyge
Hapsiceraurus
Heliomera
Heliomeroides
Holia
Hyrokybe
Junggarella
Kawina
Kolymella
Krattaspis
Ktenoura
Laneites
Lehua
Leviceraurus
Nieszkowskia
Onycopyge
Osekaspis
Pandaspinapyga
Paraceraurus
Parasphaerexochus
Parayoungia
Parisoceraurus
Pateraspis
Patomaspis
Placoparina
Pompeckia
Proromma
Protocerauroides
Pseudocheirurus
Pseudosphaerexochus
Radiurus
Ratinkaspis
Reraspis
Skelipyx
Sphaerexochus
Sphaerocoryphe
Stubblefieldia
Sycophantia
Turantyx
Valongia
Whittakerites
Xylabion
Xystocrania
Youngia
Zazvorkaspis

References

External links 
 

 
Trilobite families
Cambrian trilobites
Ordovician trilobites
Silurian trilobites
Devonian trilobites
Furongian first appearances
Givetian extinctions
Paleozoic life of Newfoundland and Labrador